Benoît Salviat (born 6 March 1978 in Bordeaux, France) is a French retired footballer who last played for FC Bassin d'Arcachon in his home country.

Career

Tahiti

Playing for Tahitian club A.S. Vénus, Salviat claimed that the level of football in Tahiti was essentially amateur, with three to four full-time players in the lineup.

Reunion

Salviat went to Reunion to trial for SS Saint-Louisienne in 2003, making his league debut in a league round facing US Stade Tamponnaise.

Singapore

Upon in Singapore with Tanjong Pagar United in 2004, Salviat stated that unrelenting heat there wore him out and made him constantly tired. He then left Singapore in winter that year after making some appearances.

References

External links 
 at Footballdatabase.eu
 at ZeroZero

1978 births
Living people
Association football midfielders
Footballers from Bordeaux
French footballers
French expatriate footballers
Singapore Premier League players
FC Girondins de Bordeaux players
Tanjong Pagar United FC players
French expatriate sportspeople in Singapore
Associação Naval 1º de Maio players
SS Saint-Louisienne players